Nándor Kováts (May 18, 1881 – January 4, 1945) was a Hungarian track and field athlete and gymnast who competed in the 1906 Summer Olympics and in the 1908 Summer Olympics. He was born in Budapest.

In 1906 he was a member of the Hungarian gymnastics team which finished sixth in the team all-around competition. He also participated in the 110 metre hurdles event but was eliminated in the first round.

Two years later he was eliminated in the semi-finals of the 400 metre hurdles competition after finishing third in his heat. He also participated in the 110 metre hurdles event but was eliminated in the first round.

At the 1912 Games he finished 26th in the Olympic long jump contest.

References

External links
profile

1881 births
1945 deaths
Athletes from Budapest
Hungarian male artistic gymnasts
Hungarian male hurdlers
Hungarian male long jumpers
Olympic gymnasts of Hungary
Olympic athletes of Hungary
Gymnasts at the 1906 Intercalated Games
Athletes (track and field) at the 1906 Intercalated Games
Athletes (track and field) at the 1908 Summer Olympics
Athletes (track and field) at the 1912 Summer Olympics
Gymnasts from Budapest